KXAL-LP (104.7 FM) was a low-power radio station licensed to Chalk Hill Community, Texas, United States. The station aired a format consisting of classical music and jazz, and was owned by The Church at Lake Cherokee.

104.7 KXAL-LP signed on in 2002 as KZQX-LP, owned by Chalk Hill Educational Media and airing an adult standards format. Principals of Chalk Hill Educational Media then acquired KXAL-FM (100.3 MHz) in 2009; as a result, they had to divest the low-power FM license, which was sold to The Church at Lake Cherokee and changed to a light classical and jazz format. The sale was finalized in November 2009, and at that time 104.7 became KXAL-LP and 100.3 became KZQX.

On May 1, 2018, the station turned in its license for cancellation stating that "it has become obvious...that KXAL-LP has outlived its usefulness" and that the owners had searched unsuccessfully for a new owner to donate the station to. The Federal Communications Commission cancelled the license on May 24, 2018.

References

External links
 
FCC App BALL-20090827ABS
FCC App BALH-20090831ABK

XAL-LP
Classical music radio stations in the United States
Jazz radio stations in the United States
XAL-LP
Radio stations established in 2003
2003 establishments in Texas
Defunct radio stations in the United States
Radio stations disestablished in 2018
2018 disestablishments in Texas
XAL-LP